John N. Damoose (born February 5, 1972) is an American politician and television producer serving as a member of the Michigan Senate for the 37th district. He has served since January 1, 2023, succeeding Wayne Schmidt after redistricting. He previously served as a member of the Michigan House of Representatives from the 107th district.

Education 
Damoose earned a Bachelor of Arts degree in political science from the University of Michigan in 1994.

Career 
After graduating from college, Damoose worked for the Christian Broadcast Network in Virginia Beach, Virginia and later as a producer on The 700 Club. In 1997, he returned to Michigan, where he founded 45 North Productions with his father. Damoose has also written several books, including Red Sky in the Morning.

In the 2020 Republican primary, Damoose placed first in a field of seven candidates for a seat in the Michigan House of Representatives. Damoose then defeated Democratic nominee Jim Page in the November general election. He assumed office on January 1, 2021.

Personal life 
Damoose and his wife live in Harbor Springs, Michigan. Damoose's grandfather, Naseeb G. “Ance” Damoose, was a political leader who served as the city manager of Ypsilanti, Michigan in the 1950s. Damoose's father, John B. Damoose was a marketing executive at Chrysler and Ford Motor Company before establishing 45 North Productions.

References 

Living people
Chrysler people
Ford people
People from Harbor Springs, Michigan
Republican Party members of the Michigan House of Representatives
University of Michigan alumni
21st-century American politicians
Television producers from Michigan
1972 births